Jump! is a studio album by Van Dyke Parks. It was released in 1984 on Warner Bros. The album (and its accompanying children's book) is a retelling of Joel Chandler Harris's Uncle Remus tales. Parks mixes numerous musical styles.  On Jump! these include bluegrass, Tin Pan Alley, 1930s jazz, and Broadway musical.

Track listing
All lyrics written by Martin Fyodr Kibbee and Van Dyke Parks, except where noted; all music composed by Van Dyke Parks.
"Jump!" (instrumental) – 2:02
"Opportunity for Two" – 3:16
"Come Along" – 3:26
"I Ain't Goin' Home" – 3:45
"Many a Mile to Go" – 3:42
"Taps" (instrumental) – 2:16
"An Invitation to Sin" – 3:20
"Home" (Lyrics: Terry Gilkyson and Parks) – 2:55
"After the Ball" – 3:52
"Look Away" (Lyrics: Parks) – 4:03
"Hominy Grove" – 3:26

Personnel
Van Dyke Parks - vocals, piano
Jennifer Warnes - background vocals
Lennie Niehaus - arranger, conductor
Kathy Dalton - vocals
Jim Keltner, Robert Greenidge - drums
Stanley Behrens - harmonica, alto horn
Jim Hughart - bass guitar
Danny Hutton - vocals
Tommy Morgan - harmonica
Emil Richards - percussion
Fred Tackett - guitar, banjo, mandolin
Ken Watson - cymbals
Gayle Levant - harp
Ian Freebairn-Smith - vocal arrangement

References

External links

Jump! lyrics

1984 albums
Van Dyke Parks albums
Warner Records albums